The vice chairman of the Standing Committee of the Supreme People's Assembly is one of the members that form the Standing Committee of the Supreme People's Assembly. The vice chairman of the SPA Standing Committee is elected by the Supreme People's Assembly alongside the SPA Standing Committee's chairman, secretary general and members. From 1972 until 1998, the vice chairman of the SPA Standing Committee was concurrently the vice chairman of the Supreme People's Assembly.

The current vice chairmen of the SPA Standing Committee are Kang Yun-sok, who was elected on 29 September 2021, and Kim Ho-chol, who was elected on 18 January 2023.

List of office holders

Honorary Vice President of the Presidium of the Supreme People's Assembly 
The 1998 revision of the 1972 Constitution created the position of Honorary Vice President of the Presidium of the Supreme People's Assembly for deputies to the Supreme People's Assembly who had served for a long time and made special contributions. Honorary SPA Presidium vice presidents are elected by the Supreme People's Assembly. This position was abolished in 2019.

References 

Supreme People's Assembly
Parliamentary titles